The yellowface pikeblenny (Chaenopsis limbaughi) is a species of chaenopsid blenny found in coral reefs in the western central Atlantic, including the Bahamas and Caribbean.  It can reach a maximum length of  TL. This species feeds primarily on crustaceans, finfish, and worms and can be found in the commercial aquarium trade. The specific name honours the zoologist, diver and underwater photographer Conrad Limbaugh (1925-1960).

References
 Robins, C. R. and J. E. Randall 1965 (28 Oct.) Three new western Atlantic fishes of the blennioid genus Chaenopsis, with notes on the related Lucayablennius zingaro. Proceedings of the Academy of Natural Sciences of Philadelphia v. 117 (no. 6): 213–234.

External links
 

limbaughi
Fish of the Caribbean
Fish of the Dominican Republic
yellowface pikeblenny